The Mayos de Navojoa are a professional baseball team in the Mexican Pacific League based in Navojoa, Sonora. 

They have been champions of the league twice. The first time was for the 1978–79 season, with Rickey Henderson on the roster and  Chuck Goggin (USA) as coach. The next time was for the 1999–2000 season, with Lorenzo Bundy (USA) as manager.

Roster

Famous players

Pitchers

 Manuel "Ciclón" Echeverría
 Jeff Fassero
 Bob Greenwood
 Mike Hampton
 Dyar Miller
 Ángel Moreno
 Randy Niemann
 José Peña
 Enrique Romo
 Fernando Valenzuela
 Héctor Velázquez

Infielders

 Morgan Burkhart
 Juan Gabriel Castro
 Archi Cianfrocco
 Luis Alfonso Cruz
 Ramón "Abulón" Hernández
 Whitey Herzog
 Aaron Holbert
 Mario Mendoza
 Kevin Millar
 Troy Neel
 Jorge Orta
 Óscar Robles
 Scott Thorman
 Kevin Youkilis
 Freddy Sanchez

Outfielders

 Randy Arozarena
 Ryan Christenson
 Rickey Henderson
 Brandon Jones
 Trot Nixon
 Curtis Pride
 Matt Stairs
 Matt Young (outfielder)

References

External links
  Official site.
 FanSite de Mayos de Navojoa

Navojoa Mayos
Sports teams in Sonora
Baseball teams established in 1959
1959 establishments in Mexico